It's a Big Country An American Anthology is a 1951 American anthology film consisting of eight segments by seven directors: Richard Thorpe, John Sturges, Charles Vidor, Don Weis, Clarence Brown, William A. Wellman and Don Hartman.

Plot
In episode 1, "Interruptions, Interruptions", directed by Richard Thorpe, a professor traveling on a train is asked by a fellow passenger if he too loves "America". The professor then asks, "Which America?" After listening to the professor explain the different aspects of America, the passenger goes to the dining car and, upon hearing an older woman comment how wonderful America is, he asks her, "Lady, which America?"

In episode 2, "The Lady and the Census Taker", directed by John Sturges, Mrs. Brian Riordan, an elderly Irish immigrant woman from Boston, is upset about not having been counted in the 1950 census. She visits newspaper editor Callaghan to intervene on her behalf and he sends reporter Michael Fisher to interview her by pretending to be a census taker, but she recognizes Fisher, having seen him at the newspaper. Callaghan then publicizes the story and an actual census taker arrives to count her.

Episode 3, "The Negro Story", with no director credit, is a five-minute narrated documentary featuring Black Americans, starting with their military service in the Navy. There are clips of a Black midshipman becoming an ensign upon graduating from Annapolis, Black sailors, WACs, and paratroopers are shown, followed by scenes in London of the first Black general Benjamin O. Davis Sr. and his son Benjamin O. Davis Jr. The newsreel footage then moves on to sports figures Jackie Robinson, Jesse Owens, Joe Louis, Sugar Ray Robinson and Levi Jackson.  Entertainers Marian Anderson (performing in front of the Lincoln Memorial), Lena Horne, Ethel Waters, Duke Ellington, Louis Armstrong, Eddie "Rochester" Anderson and the Berry Brothers are also depicted. Those who have contributed to public service are then featured — New York City judges Francis Rivers and Jane Bolin, radiologist Benjamin W. Anthony, New York Congressman Adam Clayton Powell Jr., the Right Reverend Bravid Harris, Federal judge Irvin Mollison, California Deputy Attorney General Pauli Murray, architect Paul Williams, 1946 American Mother of the Year Mrs. Emma Clement and Nobel Peace Prize winner Dr. Ralph Bunche. Finally, there is newsreel footage of George Washington Carver, who died in 1943, "and in New York University's American Hall of Fame are the figures of many great Americans of the past and among them is the immortal Booker T. Washington", who died in 1915.

In episode 4, "Rosika the Rose", directed by Charles Vidor, Hungarian immigrant Stefan Szabo is in the business of selling paprika. He has six daughters and does not want them to marry men of other nationalities. Rosa falls in love with Icarus Xenophon, who is Greek, and must overcome her father's objections.

In episode 5, "Letter from Korea", directed by Don Weis, Maxie Klein, a young Jewish soldier, who was wounded during the Korean War, is on his way home in Chicago. He stops along the way to look up the mother of a young man, an Army buddy, who was killed in action. The mother is not sure what to make of Maxie because her son mentioned no Jewish friend, but ends up touched by his visit.

In episode 6, "Texas", directed by Clarence Brown, a tall Texas man takes it upon himself to separate the fact from the fiction.

In episode 7, "Minister in Washington", directed by William A. Wellman, Adam Burch, a minister in 1944 Washington, D.C., whose parishioners include the President of the United States, sometimes tailors his sermons specifically for the President, only to learn later that the President was unable to attend services that day. Scolded to speak for all rather than to one, Rev. Burch gives the sermon of his life, and then learns to his surprise that the President was present on that day and heard every word.

In episode 8, "Four Eyes", directed by Don Hartman, Miss Coleman, a school teacher in San Francisco, discovers that her pupil Joey needs glasses. Joey's father, Mr. Esposito, believes they are not necessary and will only bring Joey ridicule from his peers. In the end, it is the father who learns the error of such a belief.

Cast
WITH THE FOLLOWING CITIZENS:

Reception
According to MGM records the film earned $526,000 in the US and Canada and $129,000 elsewhere, resulting in a loss to the studio of $677,000.

References

External links
 
 
 
 

1951 films
1951 drama films
American anthology films
American black-and-white films
American drama films
American propaganda films
1950s English-language films
Films directed by Charles Vidor
Films directed by Clarence Brown
Films directed by Don Weis
Films directed by John Sturges
Films directed by Richard Thorpe
Films directed by William A. Wellman
Films set in the United States
Metro-Goldwyn-Mayer films
Films with screenplays by William Ludwig
1950s American films